This page lists sport utility vehicles currently in production (as of 2013) as well as past models. The list includes crossover SUVs, Mini SUVs, Compact SUVs and other similar vehicles. Also includes hybrid, luxury, sport or tuned, military, electric and fuel cell versions. Due to similarity, Sport Utility Trucks are also in this list.

Note: Many of the vehicles (both current and past) are related to other vehicles in the list. A vehicle listed as a 'past model' may still be in production in an updated form under a different name, it may be listed under that name in the 'currently in production' section. Also, some vehicles are sold under different marques in different geographical locations, therefore some vehicles may be listed more than once but usually link to the same page. Different states may also classify vehicles differently. What may be considered an SUV in one state, may not in another state. Example; The Chevrolet Trax is known as the Chevrolet Tracker in Russia and Brazil, and in Australia and New Zealand, it is marketed by GM Holden (Holden Trax). Some images provided below may be pictures of outdated models.


Currently in production

Similar Military/Commercial vehicles 
This is not a complete list

Past Models

External links 
 
 List of Popular Sport utility vehicles

Sport utility vehicles
 List